Denmark is an unincorporated community in Lafayette County, Mississippi, United States. A post office operated under the name Denmark from 1872 to 1968. In 1900, Denmark had a population of 75.

References

Unincorporated communities in Lafayette County, Mississippi
Unincorporated communities in Mississippi